Perrierodendron occidentale is a tree in the family Sarcolaenaceae. It is endemic to Madagascar.

Description
Its chartaceous leaves are obovate to elliptical in shape. The inflorescences bear one to five flowers, each with five sepals and five petals.

Distribution and habitat
Perrierodendron occidentale is widely distributed in the western regions of Haute Matsiatra, Ihorombe and Atsimo-Andrefana. Its habitat is forests from sea level to  altitude. Some subpopulations are in Isalo and Zombitse-Vohibasia National Parks.

References

Sarcolaenaceae
Endemic flora of Madagascar
Trees of Madagascar
Plants described in 2000